David Daiches Raphael (January 25, 1916 -  December 22, 2015) was a philosopher. He is known for his writings on Adam Smith, Thomas Hobbes, justice, the rights of man, and his 1981, introductory philosophical book; Moral Philosophy.

References

External links 
 The University of Glasgow Story
 International Association for Scottish Philosophy

1916 births
British philosophers
2015 deaths
Historians of economic thought
Historians of philosophy